Sizewell is an English fishing hamlet in the East Suffolk district of Suffolk, England. It belongs to the civil parish of Leiston and lies on the North Sea coast just north of the larger holiday village of Thorpeness, between the coastal towns of Aldeburgh and Southwold. It is the site of two nuclear power stations, one of them still active. There have been tentative plans for a third station to be built at the site.

Nuclear power stations

The village is the location of two separate nuclear power stations, the Magnox Sizewell A and Pressurized Water Reactor (PWR) Sizewell B, which are readily visible to the north of the village. Sizewell A is decommissioned, having ceased to generate electricity in 2006. The decommissioning process is expected to take until 2027 to complete, with the site not expected to be cleared until 2098. There were plans to build a third nuclear power station nearby, but by May 2013 there were significant doubts about whether an agreement would be reached with the government. However, in October 2021, the government announced new funding rules to allow the funding to be found through the RAB (Regulated Asset Base).

"Chernobyl twinned with Sizewell" was a slogan used by anti-nuclear campaigners.

Sizewell Marshes

Sizewell Marshes form a 260-acre (105.4-ha) biological Site of Special Scientific Interest on the edge of Sizewell, in the Suffolk Coast and Heaths Area of Outstanding Natural Beauty. They are part of a 356-acre (144-ha) nature reserve managed by the Suffolk Wildlife Trust as Sizewell Belts. It is noted for its rare invertebrates and bird species, and as one of the main wetlands in East Anglia for wild flowers.

History

The hall

The village became the nucleus of the Ogilvie estate in 1859. It extended as far south as Aldeburgh. Sizewell Hall, now used as a Christian conference centre, is still owned by the Ogilvie family. From the end of the war up to the summer of 1955 it housed a mixed, semi-progressive prep school attended, among others, by the theatre critic and biographer Sheridan Morley.

Wartime

The beach at Sizewell was the landing site of Henri Peteri and his brother Willem in September 1941. The brothers left the Dutch town of Katwijk in a collapsible canoe on a journey that took 56 hours. Those who escaped occupied Holland were known as Engelandvaarders. About 1,700 Engelandvaarders reached England, including about 200 who crossed the North Sea; 32 men tried to make a canoe trip like the Peteri brothers, but only eight succeeded in reaching the English coast.

In 2005, Henri Peteri commissioned a memorial to the men who made the journey across the North Sea by canoe, consisting of a pair of crossed kayak oars and a broken paddle that commemorates those who did not survive the trip. In June 2009, the monument was unveiled by his widow on Sizewell Beach, together with the original kayak. 

An inscription on the broken paddle reads:
In memory of the thirty-two young Dutchmen who tried to escape to England by kayak during World War II to join the Allied Forces. Eight of them reached the English coast. Only three survived the war. 

The last living survivor dedicated this memorial to his brothers in arms who were less fortunate. He reached England – and freedom – on this beach on 21 September 1941.

Historical writings
In 1870–1872, John Marius Wilson's Imperial Gazetteer of England and Wales described the hamlet as

In 1887, John Bartholomew wrote a shorter description of Sizewell in his Gazetteer of the British Isles:

Facilities
Sizewell retains a few basic services associated with tourism, including a refreshment kiosk and a public house, the Vulcan Arms. A handful of fishing boats operate from the beach.

References

External links

Sizewell Hall
British Nuclear Group, Sizewell A
British Energy — Sizewell B

Villages in Suffolk
Populated coastal places in Suffolk
Leiston